Mizuho literally means "abundant rice" in Japanese and "harvest" in the figurative sense. It was also an ancient name of Japan. It might refer to:

Places
 Mizuho, Gifu, a city in Gifu
 Mizuho, Tokyo, a town in Tokyo
 Mizuho Plateau in Antarctica
 Mizuho Station (Antarctica)
 Mizuho Township, former name during the Japanese colonial period of the town of Ruisui, Hualien in Taiwan

People
 Mizuho Ōta (1876–1955), Japanese poet
 Mizuho Suzuki (born 1927), Japanese actor
 Mizuho Fukushima (born 1955), Japanese female politician
 Mizuho Aimoto (born 1964), Japanese female manga artist
 Mizuho Yoshida (born 1965), Japanese actor
 Mizuho Katayama (born 1969), female synchronized swimming coach in Japan who represented South Korea at the 1988 Olympics
 Mizuho Kusanagi (born 1979), Japanese female manga artist
, Japanese long-distance runner
 Mizuho Sakaguchi (born 1987), Japanese female association footballer
 Mizuho Saito, member of the former Japanese band Zone

Fictional characters and places
 Mizuho Kazami, a character in the anime Please Teacher!
 Mizuho Miyanokouji, a character in the game and anime Otome wa Boku ni Koishiteru
 Mizuho, a fictional ninja village in the video game Tales of Symphonia
 Mizuho Asano, a side-character in the anime & manga Bleach

Other
 
 Mizuho (train), a train service in Japan
 2090 Mizuho, an asteroid 
 Mizuho Financial Group, a Japanese banking conglomerate

Japanese unisex given names